Hans-Jürgen Kurrat (born 7 July 1944 in Dortmund) is a retired German football striker.

His brother, Dieter, was also a former footballer.

References

External links
Hans-Jürgen Kurrat at worldfootball.net 

1944 births
Living people
German footballers
Borussia Dortmund players
Rot-Weiss Essen players
Arminia Bielefeld players
Footballers from Dortmund
FC Viktoria Köln players
FC Gütersloh 2000 players
Bundesliga players
Hammer SpVg players
Association football forwards
West German footballers